Cesare Brambilla (3 May 1885 – 3 March 1954) was an Italian racing cyclist. He won the 1906 edition of the Giro di Lombardia.

References

External links
 

1885 births
1954 deaths
Italian male cyclists
Cyclists from the Province of Monza e Brianza